The 1893 Swarthmore Quakers football team was an American football team that represented Swarthmore College as an independent during the 1893 college football season. The team compiled a 6–2–1 record and outscored opponents by a total of 222 to 70. Jacob K. Shell was the head coach.

Schedule

References

Swarthmore
Swarthmore Garnet Tide football seasons
Swarthmore Quakers football